KK Best  is a defunct basketball club based in Gevgelija, North Macedonia. They played in the Macedonian First League.

History
The club was founded in 2012, the first two seasons KK Best spend in the Macedonian Second Basketball league. In the season 2014/15 the team finished second on the table with the same number of points as two other teams, but having a better scoring difference of +234 (the best in the season) they get promoted to Macedonian First League.

Current roster

External links
 

Basketball teams in North Macedonia
Gevgelija Municipality